is a private four-year college in Katsushika, Tokyo, Japan founded in 2005 to replace Seitoku Junior College of Nutrition, which was founded in 1947 and chartered as a junior college in 1963. 
Its name, Sei-ei is how its predecessor was abbreviated in Japanese: Sei (聖) stands for Seitoku and Ei (栄) is for "nutrition".

External links
 Official website 

Educational institutions established in 1947
Private universities and colleges in Japan
Universities and colleges in Tokyo
1947 establishments in Japan
Katsushika